The 2000–01 Czech Extraliga season was the eighth season of the Czech Extraliga since its creation after the breakup of Czechoslovakia and the Czechoslovak First Ice Hockey League in 1993.

Standings

Playoffs

Quarterfinal
 HC Slovnaft Vsetín - HC Continental Zlín 4:3 (3:1,1:1,0:1)
 HC Slovnaft Vsetín - HC Continental Zlín 1:2 PP (0:1,1:0,0:0,0:1)
 HC Continental Zlín - HC Slovnaft Vsetín 3:5 (1:0,2:2,0:3)
 HC Continental Zlín - HC Slovnaft Vsetín 1:2 (0:0,0:1,1:1)
 HC Slovnaft Vsetín - HC Continental Zlín 0:2 (0:0,0:0,0:2)
 HC Continental Zlín - HC Slovnaft Vsetín 2:3 PP (1:2,1:0,0:0,0:1)
 HC Excalibur Znojemští Orli - HC Slavia Praha 5:2 (1:1,1:1,3:0)
 HC Excalibur Znojemští Orli - HC Slavia Praha 4:0 (1:0,1:0,2:0)
 HC Slavia Praha - HC Excalibur Znojemští Orli 6:0 (3:0,2:0,1:0)
 HC Slavia Praha - HC Excalibur Znojemští Orli 1:0 (0:0,1:0,0:0)
 HC Excalibur Znojemští Orli - HC Slavia Praha 0:3 (0:1,0:1,0:1)
 HC Slavia Praha - HC Excalibur Znojemští Orli 2:3 (1:2,1:1,0:0)
 HC Excalibur Znojemští Orli - HC Slavia Praha 1:3 (0:1,0:1,1:1)
 HC IPB Pojišťovna Pardubice - HC Vítkovice 3:4 (1:1,1:3,1:0)
 HC IPB Pojišťovna Pardubice - HC Vítkovice 6:3 (4:3,1:0,1:0)
 HC Vítkovice - HC IPB Pojišťovna Pardubice 1:4 (1:1,0:0,0:3)
 HC Vítkovice - HC IPB Pojišťovna Pardubice 4:3 (3:1,0:1,1:1)
 HC IPB Pojišťovna Pardubice - HC Vítkovice 6:1 (3:1,3:0,0:0)
 HC Vítkovice - HC IPB Pojišťovna Pardubice 2:1 PP (0:0,0:1,1:0,1:0)
 HC IPB Pojišťovna Pardubice - HC Vítkovice 3:4 (1:2,1:1,1:1)
 HC Chemopetrol Litvínov - HC Sparta Praha 4:5 SN (1:1,0:1,3:2,0:0)
 HC Chemopetrol Litvínov - HC Sparta Praha 3:1 (2:0,1:1,0:0)
 HC Sparta Praha - HC Chemopetrol Litvínov 1:0 (0:0,0:0,1:0)
 HC Sparta Praha - HC Chemopetrol Litvínov 2:3 SN (0:0,2:1,0:1,0:0)
 HC Chemopetrol Litvínov - HC Sparta Praha 1:4 (0:2,0:1,1:1)
 HC Sparta Praha - HC Chemopetrol Litvínov 3:0 (2:0,0:0,1:0)

Semifinal
 HC Slovnaft Vsetín - HC Slavia Praha 4:0 (0:0,2:0,2:0)
 HC Slovnaft Vsetín - HC Slavia Praha 3:2 (1:0,1:1,1:1)
 HC Slavia Praha - HC Slovnaft Vsetín 4:2 (0:2,2:0,2:0)
 HC Slavia Praha - HC Slovnaft Vsetín 5:6 PP (2:0,2:2,1:3,0:1)
 HC Sparta Praha - HC Vítkovice 3:2 (0:1,2:1,1:0)
 HC Sparta Praha - HC Vítkovice 3:1 (1:0,2:0,0:1)
 HC Vítkovice - HC Sparta Praha 2:3 (1:1,0:0,1:2)

Final
HC Slovnaft Vsetin - HC Sparta Praha 3–2, 3–4, 6–3, 4-1

HC Vsetin is 2000-01 Czech Extraliga champion.

Relegation

 HC Becherovka Karlovy Vary - KLH Chomutov 3:2 (2:0,1:0,0:2)
 HC Becherovka Karlovy Vary - KLH Chomutov 5:1 (3:1,0:0,2:0)
 KLH Chomutov - HC Becherovka Karlovy Vary 2:0 (1:0,1:0,0:0)
 KLH Chomutov - HC Becherovka Karlovy Vary 5:4 SN (1:1,2:2,1:1,0:0)
 HC Becherovka Karlovy Vary - KLH Chomutov 5:1 (0:1,2:0,3:0)
 KLH Chomutov - HC Becherovka Karlovy Vary 2:5 (1:1,0:3,1:1)

References

External links 
 

Czech Extraliga seasons
1
Czech